Dieveniškės  (in Lithuanian literally: Place of gods; ;  Dzevyanishki) is a town in the Vilnius County of Lithuania, about  from the Belarusian border in the so-called Dieveniškės appendix. It is surrounded by the Dieveniškės Regional Park.

History 

The estate of Dieveniškės was first mentioned in 1385 as a village of a Lithuanian noble Mykolas Mingaila, possibly the son of Gedgaudas, later ruled by the Goštautai family. Stanislovas Goštautas visited Dieveniškės with his wife Barbara Radziwill, who used to pray in Dieveniškės church, built in the 16th century. According to the 1897 census, 75% of the village population were Jewish. The shtetl had 2 synagogues. The Jews were murdered during the Holocaust in Lithuania.

The people living in the Dieveniškės were ethnically mixed (Lithuanian, Polish, Belarusian), who happened to fall under Belarus’ authority, as this region was assigned to Belarus post-1939. After many requests by only the Lithuanian residents of the area (and not the others, since the majority of residents were Lithuanians), Belarus gave this area voluntarily to Lithuania in 1940. As the result, Dieveniškės becomes a 207-square-kilometre Lithuanian salient surrounded by and intruding some 30 kilometres into the Belarusian territory. At its neck, the “Lithuanian appendix” is barely 3 kilometres wide. And it remains part of Lithuania to this date. According to 1989 census, a little over 60 percent of people there considered they were Polish.

References

Towns in Lithuania
Towns in Vilnius County
Oshmyansky Uyezd
Wilno Voivodeship (1926–1939)
Holocaust locations in Lithuania